Shmuel Safrai (Hebrew: שמואל ספראי) (born 1919; died 2003) was Professor Emeritus of History of the Jewish People at Hebrew University. Safrai authored over eighty articles and twelve books.

Awards
In 1986, Safrai received the Jerusalem Prize.

In 2002, he was awarded the Israel Prize for Land of Israel studies.

See also
List of Israel Prize recipients

References

External links
Jerusalem School of Synoptic Research: Deceased Members
Online Biography
Safrai, Shmuel in the Jewish Virtual Library.
Articles by Shmuel Safrai published online on Jerusalem Perspective.

1919 births
2003 deaths
Israel Prize in history recipients
Israel Prize in Land of Israel studies recipients
Jewish writers